Jacek Rozenek (born 31 March 1969 in Warsaw) is a Polish stage, movie, television and voice actor. Among other roles, he is known for being the original Polish voice of Geralt of Rivia in The Witcher video games.

In 2019 he suffered a stroke, as a result of which he has temporarily lost control over the right part of the body and the ability to speak. As he recovered both his speech and mobility, he was dismissed from hospital and is currently undergoing a full rehabilitation program at the Care and Rehabilitation Center "Forest Glade".

References

External links

 
 
 

1969 births
Living people
Polish male stage actors
Polish male film actors
Polish male television actors
Polish male voice actors